Game of the Century may refer to:

Sports
The Game of the Century (chess), a chess game between Donald Byrne and Bobby Fischer in 1956
Game of the Century (college basketball), a basketball game between the Houston Cougars and UCLA Bruins in 1968
Game of the Century (college football), any one of several games in U.S. college football
Italy v West Germany (1970 FIFA World Cup), the semi-final of the 1970 FIFA World Cup between Italy and West Germany
The Game of the Century (Go), a game of Go between Honinbo Shusai and Go Seigen in 1934

Television
The Game of the Century (TV series), 1978 British TV series

See also
Bridge Battle of the Century
Empire: Wargame of the Century
Match of the Century (disambiguation)
Game of the Year (disambiguation)
The Greatest Game Ever Played (disambiguation)